Angus Powell is an English-born singer-songwriter, who grew up in Mid Wales. After training as an actor in Manchester, Powell was in various bands before he started concentrating on his own music, turning to write songs, record and honing his sound.

Sending his music out to anyone he could, it came to the attention of Los Angeles-based film and television sync agent, Danny Benair (also formerly of The Quick and other power pop acts) who started to send his music out to music supervisors, with great reactions. At the same time, Powell's music was heard by emergent Halogen Media, who signed Powell and released his debut EP Monsters, the title track being used in worldwide TV shows Elementary (CBS), Kingdom (Audience Network) and the indie film Go North and another EP track "Hole In My Heart" being used in Bones (Fox), Finding Carter (MTV) and Idris Elba film 100 Streets. His song "Shiver" was used in supernatural horror Visions (Universal Pictures) starring Isla Fisher.

Whilst Powell recorded his debut album with Paul Moessl producing, awareness of Angus Powell's music grew with KCRW in Los Angeles featuring "Monsters" as their Top Tune, and Paste Magazine premiered the video.

Halogen then followed up the EP with the release of his debut album, Before the Grey on 29 September 2017.

Shortly after his album release, his song "Truth" was used in Criminal Minds (CBS) and (MTV) also featured a number of Powell's songs on their 2018 hit show Teen Mom: Young and Pregnant.

Releases

EPs and albums
 Monsters EP (self-released, 2010)
 Waylaid EP (self-released, 2012)
 Monsters EP  (re-release) (Halogen Media, 2014)
 Before The Grey Album (Halogen Media 2017)

Singles
 Monsters (self-released, 2010)
 Monsters – (re-release) (Halogen Media, Awal, 2014)
 Holding Up The Heavy – (Halogen Media, Awal, 2021)
 Grow Wings On The Way Down - (Halogen Media, Awal, 2021

Collaborations
 Already There – Angus Powell, Brian Laruso (Magic Island Deep, Black Hole, 2015)
 Not Alone – Angus Powell, Roger Shah, Brian Laruso (Magic Island Records, Black Hole, 2018)
 Go Right Through - Angus Powell, Westseven (2020)
 Headlights - Angus Powell, Jonas Saalbach (Radikon 2021)

Compilations 
 100 Streets [Original Motion Picture Soundtrack] – Various Artists

TV placements 
 Elementary (CBS) – Enough Nemesis to Go Around (2014) 'Monsters Kingdom (Audience network) – Please Refrain from Crying (2014)  Monsters'
 Bones (Fox) – The Loyalty in the Lie (2015) Hole in my Heart'
 Finding Carter (MTV) – The Corrections (2015) 'Hole in my Heart'
 Criminal Minds (CBS) – False Flag (2017) '''Truth'
 Teen Mom: Young + Pregnant (MTV) – (Various episodes 2018–present) Trenches, Shiver', 'Hole In My Heart', 'Monsters', 'Pulls Me Under'
 Kingdom (Netflix) – Please Refrain from Crying (2020)  Monsters Film placements 
 Visions  (Universal Pictures) (2015) – 'Shiver' 
 Soft Lad (2015) – 'Monsters', 'Shiver 
 100 Streets (2016) – 'Hole in my Heart' 
 Go North (2017) – '''Monsters' 
 Daisy Winters (2017) – 'Monsters'

References

Living people
English folk singers
English folk guitarists
English pianists
English songwriters
Year of birth missing (living people)